Indonesia and Malaysia men's national football teams are sporting rivals and have played each other over 50 matches. It is one of Southeast Asia and Asia's rivalries, and is one of Asia's best known football rivalries. The heated political conflict between victims in the 1960s transmitted disease to the football field. The spicy words "Down with Malaysia!" which was put forward by the Indonesian president Sukarno, in a 1963 political speech in Jakarta as if to be an encouragement for the Red-White Team when they were going to talk with the Malaysian national team. Matches involving the two countries, whether in Jakarta or Kuala Lumpur, are always crowded with spectators. When the match takes place, there are often controversial incidents: two fans died in 2011 in a stampede during a Southeast Asian Games final between the under-23 teams of Indonesia and Malaysia in Jakarta. The two teams most recently met in the 2020 AFF Championship, with Indonesia winning 4–1.

Matches
Matches between B teams, age-group teams, clubs, or selection teams are not included, only those from senior teams.

Overall

Honours

See also
 Indonesia–Malaysia relations

References

Indonesia national football team
Malaysia national football team
Indonesia–Malaysia relations
International association football rivalries